Herta Konrad (born 1928) is a retired Austrian stage, film and television actress.

Selected filmography
 Cabaret (1954)
 Marriages Forbidden (1957)
 Candidates for Marriage (1958)
 Nick Knatterton’s Adventure (1959)

References

Bibliography
 Francesco Bono. Willi Forst: ein filmkritisches Porträt. 2010.

External links

1928 births
Living people
Austrian stage actresses
Austrian film actresses
Actresses from Vienna